The India Records in Swimming are the fastest times ever swim by a swimmer representing India. These records are maintained by Swimming Federation of India (SFI).

SFI keeps records for both for men and women. Records are kept in the following events (by stroke):
freestyle: 50, 100, 200, 400, 800 and 1500;
backstroke: 50, 100 and 200;
breaststroke: 50, 100 and 200;
butterfly: 50, 100 and 200;
individual medley: 100 (25m only), 200 and 400;
relays: 4x100 free, 4x200 free and 4 × 100 medley.

All records were set in finals unless noted otherwise.

Long Course (50 m)

Men

|-bgcolor=#DDDDDD
|colspan=9|
|-

|-bgcolor=#DDDDDD
|colspan=9|
|-

|-bgcolor=#DDDDDD
|colspan=9|
|-

|-bgcolor=#DDDDDD
|colspan=9|
|-

|-bgcolor=#DDDDDD
|colspan=9|
|-

Women

|-bgcolor=#DDDDDD
|colspan=9|
|-

|-bgcolor=#DDDDDD
|colspan=9|
|-

|-bgcolor=#DDDDDD
|colspan=9|
|-

|-bgcolor=#DDDDDD
|colspan=9|
|-

|-bgcolor=#DDDDDD
|colspan=9|
|-

Mixed relay

Short Course (25 m)

Men

Women

References
General
Indian Long Course records 25 April 2022 updated
Specific

External links
SFI website

India
Records
Swimming
Swimming